The Europe Zone was one of the three regional zones of the 1972 Davis Cup.

33 teams entered the Europe Zone, competing across 2 sub-zones. The winners of each sub-zone went on to compete in the Inter-Zonal Zone against the winners of the Americas Zone and Eastern Zone.

Romania defeated the Soviet Union in the Zone A final, and Spain defeated Czechoslovakia in the Zone B final, resulting in both Romania and Spain progressing to the Inter-Zonal Zone.

Zone A

Draw

Preliminary round
Israel vs. Iran

First round
Romania vs. Switzerland

Iran vs. Egypt

Italy vs. Austria

Netherlands vs. Norway

Finland vs. Denmark

Poland vs. Yugoslavia

Lebanon vs. Morocco

Soviet Union vs. Hungary

Quarterfinals
Romania vs. Iran

Italy vs. Netherlands

Denmark vs. Poland

Morocco vs. Soviet Union

Semifinals
Romania vs. Italy

Poland vs. Soviet Union

Final
Soviet Union vs. Romania

Zone B

Draw

First round
Belgium vs. Czechoslovakia

Sweden vs. New Zealand

Greece vs. West Germany

Ireland vs. Turkey

France vs. Great Britain

Bulgaria vs. Spain

Monaco vs. Luxembourg

Quarterfinals
Czechoslovakia vs. Sweden

West Germany vs. Ireland

France vs. Spain

Monaco vs. Portugal

Semifinals
West Germany vs. Czechoslovakia

Spain vs. Monaco

Final
Spain vs. Czechoslovakia

References

External links
Davis Cup official website

Davis Cup Europe/Africa Zone
Europe Zone
Davis Cup
Davis Cup
Davis Cup
Davis Cup
Davis Cup
Davis Cup
1972 in German tennis